5 Lekë (5 L) have a value of 5 Albanian lek and is composed of a nickel-covered steel. The coin has been used since 1939 and has been redesigned several times, while also being printed as a banknote for the years 1942-1944 during the Italian occupation of Albania.

History
The coin dates from 1939, when Albania was occupied by the Kingdom of Italy after its invasion. It featured the fasces during Italian rule and the coat of arms during the communist regime. In 1968 the national bank minted coins to commemorate the 500 year anniversary of the death of national hero Skanderbeg, with the House of Kastrioti and Albanian coat of arms being featured on the reverse and obverse sides respectively. In 1987 it was again minted for commemorative reasons, this time featuring a ship with the Durrës Castle in the foreground. A later commemorative mint was done in 1988 to celebrate the 42 year anniversary of the first Albanian railway.

The current form was first minted in 1995, with further coins being produced in 2000, 2011 and 2014.

Design

Reverse side
The reverse side features the mint year, "Republic of Albania" written near the borders and the Albanian coat of arms in the centre.

Obverse (national) side
The obverse side features the nominal value with an olive branch in its side.

References

Currencies of Albania
Five-base-unit coins